Transtillaspis juxtonca is a species of moth of the family Tortricidae. It is found in Loja Province, Ecuador.

The wingspan is 16 mm. The ground colour of the forewings is brownish cream, strigulated (finely streaked) and dotted with brown. The hindwings are creamy, tinged ochreous at the apex and spotted with brownish grey.

Etymology
The species name refers to the shapes of the dorsal processes of the juxta and is derived from Greek: onkos (meaning hook).

References

Moths described in 2005
Transtillaspis
Moths of South America
Taxa named by Józef Razowski